Kawahara (written: ,  or  in hiragana) is a Japanese surname. Notable people with the surname include:

, Japanese baseball player
, Japanese footballer
Kazune Kawahara, Japanese manga artist
, Japanese painter
, Japanese manga artist
, Japanese speed skater
Nozomi Kawahara (born 1970), Japanese golfer
, Japanese writer
Sarah Kawahara, Canadian figure skater and choreographer
, Japanese table tennis player
, Japanese linguist
, Japanese footballer
, Japanese footballer
, Japanese manga artist

See also
Kawahara Station, a railway station in Yazu District, Tottori Prefecture, Japan
Kawahara Shrine, a Shinto shrine in Nagoya, Japan
Kawahara, Tottori, a former town in Yazu District, Tottori, Japan

Japanese-language surnames